Fyfield Down is part of the Marlborough Downs, about  north of the village of Fyfield, Wiltshire. The down is a 325.3 hectare biological and geological Site of Special Scientific Interest, notified in 1951. The down has the best assemblage of sarsen stones in England, known as the Grey Wethers.

The site is to be distinguished from another Fyfield Down also in Wiltshire, east of Pewsey and on the edge of Salisbury Plain, near another place called Fyfield.

Sarsens

The down has the best assemblage of sarsen stones in England.  The stones are known here as the Grey Wethers for their likeness to sheep when seen from a distance. They were noted by Col. Richard Symonds in his diary for 1644: "They call that place the Grey-wethers, because a far off they looke like a flock of sheepe." They support a nationally important lichen flora. An alternative name for this natural rock feature is Mother's Jam.

The Polisher

On the west side of the down is a recumbent sarsen stone with grooved markings. It is thought to be a prehistoric grinding bench for shaping, whetting, and polishing stone axe-heads, and is similar to other Neolithic and Bronze Age examples in France.

Dolmen
To the east is a prehistoric dolmen known as The Devil's Den. It is the remains of a neolithic passage grave which was reconstructed in 1921.

References

Sources
 Natural England citation sheet for the site (accessed 31 March 2022)

External links
 Natural England website (SSSI information)
 Sarsen stones on Fyfield Down on geograph
Improvised music recorded on Fyfield Down

Sites of Special Scientific Interest in Wiltshire
Sites of Special Scientific Interest notified in 1951
Hills of Wiltshire